Yasir Said Arman (born October 5, 1962) is a Sudanese politician and a leading figure in the Sudan People's Liberation Movement (SPLM). He was the SPLM's deputy secretary-general for the northern sector and its spokesman. Initially he was presented as the SPLM candidate for the April 2010 presidential election, but the party later chose to boycott the presidential election. After South Sudan's independence on July 9, 2011 and the creation of a separate SPLM party in the Republic of the Sudan (North Sudan), Arman has become the secretary general of the SPLM-N.

Arman is one of the leaders who helped draft and signed the Naivasha agreement of the Comprehensive Peace Agreement that ended the war between the north and south of Sudan in 2005. He was the head of the SPLM quota for the parliamentary faction.

Childhood and youth
Yasir Arman belongs to the Ja'alin, an arabised Nubian tribe indigenous to Northern Sudan; he was born in Tabat City in the state of Al Jazirah. He joined the Sudanese Communist Party as a student in the mid-seventies.

Arman was accused of involvement in the deaths of two pro-Islamist students at the Khartoum branch of Cairo University (now Al-Neelain University), but was subsequently acquitted of the charges in court.

SPLM activist
Arman left the Sudanese Communist Party and joined the SPLM in 1987. He became very close to the former leader John Garang. Arman was appointed as a military leader and spokesman.

Yasir Arman was arrested with other leaders in December 2009 after attempting to conduct a demonstration in Khartoum to protest against legislation passed in the parliament of Sudan.

SPLM-N (al-Agar)
After the secession of South Sudan, Arman remained in the SPLM-N group in Sudan. In the 2017 split of SPLM-N into SPLM-N (Agar) and SPLM-N (al-Hilu), Arman joined the SPLM-N (Agar) faction, becoming its deputy chair.

Personal life 
Yasir Arman is married to a daughter of Sultan Deng Majok, one of the sultans of South Sudan, and has four children.

See also 
 Comprehensive Peace Agreement
 John Garang
 Salva Kiir Mayardit

References 

Newsudan
 yasirarman.net

1961 births
Living people
Ja'alin tribe
People from Al Jazirah (state)
Sudanese Communist Party politicians
Sudan People's Liberation Movement politicians
Sudanese human rights activists